John Randolf (fl. 1410s) was the member of Parliament for Malmesbury for the parliament of April 1414.

References 

Members of the Parliament of England for Malmesbury
English MPs April 1414
Year of birth unknown
Year of death unknown